News service may refer to:

 News agency
 Usenet service provider